Jean-Paul Diamond (born 9 April 1940) is a politician in the Canadian province of Quebec, who was elected to represent the riding of Maskinongé in the National Assembly of Quebec in the 2008 provincial election. He is a member of the Quebec Liberal Party.

Diamond was a prefect for 10 years for the Maskinongé Regional County Municipality in the Mauricie region and was also mayor and councillors for the municipality of Saint-Alexis-des-Monts. He was an administrative member of the Fédération québécoise des municipalités. He also worked for the Cabinet of former Agriculture Minister Yvon Picotte and as vice-president of a local construction and paving company from over 10 years.

External links
 
 Liberal Party biography 

Living people
Quebec Liberal Party MNAs
Mayors of places in Quebec
1940 births
21st-century Canadian politicians